The Black Ninja is a 2003 American martial arts action film written, directed and starring Clayton Prince, and featuring Carla Brothers, Nicky DeMatteo, Yuki Matsuzaki, Heather Hunter, John Canada Terrell and Michael Chance. The film has been called a modern-day Blaxploitation film, and it received very poor reviews from critics. After a limited theatrical release, it was released on DVD and distributed world wide in January 2003.

Plot
Maliq Ali is a defense attorney whose guilt over freeing guilty criminals, and the death of his family, leads him to become a costumed ninja vigilante who stalks these same criminals at night. After refusing to defend Tony Fanelli, a small-time mobster accused of murder, he finds himself involved in protecting the only witness, Tracey Allen, from Fanelli's hired thugs. While protecting this young woman, he is confronted by The Red Ninja, a Japanese assassin, who years before killed his family rather than pay Ali for defending him.

Cast
Clayton Prince as Maliq Ali and The Black Ninja
Carla Brothers as Tracey Allen
Nicky DeMatteo as Tony Fanelli
Yuki Matsuzaki as Shinji Hagiwara and The Red Ninja
Heather Hunter as Patty Ali 
John Canada Terrell as Mr. Fanelli's Lawyer 
Michael Chance as Detective Howell

Production
Primarily financed by Clayton Prince, filming began in Philadelphia, Pennsylvania and ended after two weeks. An hour-long "Making of" documentary was produced and included on the DVD following its release.

Reception
The Black Ninja was given a limited theatrical release on November 2, 2002, and distributed worldwide on DVD on January 14, 2003. The film was heavily criticized for its apparent lack of martial arts choreography and generally poor quality of the story, acting and cinematography. Critics said that the rush to finish the film drastically affected its overall quality, much of which could have been cleaned up post-production editing, leaving it looking "unfinished and more like an amateur, student film".

Sources 

https://web.archive.org/web/20120508075915/http://redlettermedia.com/half-in-the-bag/whats-your-number-and-the-black-ninja/ What's Your Number and the Black Ninja

External links
 
 
 
 The Black Ninja at MSN Movies

2003 films
2003 action films
American action films
Films shot in Pennsylvania
American martial arts films
2000s English-language films
2003 martial arts films
2000s American films